Christian Baumeister (born 24 December 1971 in Münster) is a German cinematographer and award-winning director focusing on nature and wildlife productions.

Career 
Baumeister studied biology in Germany and wildlife filmmaking in the United Kingdom. He lived for eight years in Brazil and he is specialized in filming in Latin America.

In 2001 he established his own production company,  Light & Shadow GmbH, with an office in Münster, Germany. In the past years, Baumeister has garnered international acclaim for his wildlife films, from audiences and critics around the world. His previous projects took him to Europe, Asia, Africa and South America. He has established himself with productions on the international television market and works with broadcasters such as ARD, ZDF, BBC, NDR, ARTE, ORF, Discovery Channel, Smithsonian Institution and Channel and the National Geographic Channel.

For his series about the Andes Mountains, Baumeister was nominated for "Outstanding Cinematography" and "Outstanding Music & Sound" at the 40th News & Documentary EMMY Awards 2019 in the US.

Filmography

Wildlife Series 
 2022: Wild Argentina (UHD) 3 x 50 min / 1 x 90 min - LIGHT & SHADOW for WDR, NDR Naturfilm, arte, ORF and National Geographic
 2018: The Wild Andes (UHD) 3 x 50 min / 1 x 90 min: LIGHT & SHADOW for WDR, Smithsonian Channel, NDR Naturfilm / Doclights, arte, ORF, SVT, SRF, Autentic Distribution
2014: Wild Brazil (HD) 5 x 50 min: LIGHT & SHADOW for Terra Mater Factual Studios, National Geographic Wild
 2010: Amazon Alive (HD) 3 x 45 min: LIGHT & SHADOW for NDR Naturfilm, Arte, ORF, Parthenon Entertainment Ltd. / National Geographic Channel International, Animal Planet

Producer, Director & Cinematographer 
 2022: Nature's Magic Moments (UHD) 50 min - LIGHT & SHADOW for WDR, NDR, arte
 2020: Accidental Wilderness - Europe's Everglades (UHD) 50 min - LIGHT & SHADOW for WDR, arte and Love Nature
 2019: Portugal - Europe's Wild West (UHD) 50 min - LIGHT & SHADOW for WDR, NDR Naturfilm
2016: Iron Jungle - Nature's Return to the Ruhr Valley (HD) 43 min - LIGHT & SHADOW for WDR, NDR Naturfilm, Albatross World Sales
2012: Raccoons - The New Europeans (HD) 43 min - (director: Heiko de Groot)  LIGHT & SHADOW for WDR, NDR Naturfilm, Albatross World Sales
2011: Jaguar – One Strike to the Kill - (HD) 50 min - LIGHT & SHADOW for NDR Naturfilm, Arte, National Geographic Channel
2011: Europe's Last Wild Horses - (HD) 50 min - LIGHT & SHADOW for WDR, NDR Naturfilm, Off-the-Fence
2010: The Real Guinea Pig - (HD) 43 min (Regie: Herbert Ostwald) - LIGHT & SHADOW for ZDF, Arte, ZDF Enterprises
2010:  (cinema) 91 min - Narrator: Siegfried Rauch
2008: Kamchatka[1] – Land of fire and Ice (HD) 50 min - LIGHT & SHADWO for NDR Naturfilm, WDR, Parthenon Entertainment, NGCI, Animal Planet US
2006: The Falls of Iguacu (HD) 50 min - LIGHT & SHADWO for NDR, BBC, ORF and Parthenon Entertainment / NGCI (HD)
2004: Wild Rio (HD) 50 min - LIGHT & SHADOW for NDR Naturfilm, ORF, Parthenon Entertainment Ltd. / National Geographic Channel International
2002: Viva Vicuña (HD) 50 min - LIGHT & SHADOW for ZDF, ARTE & Discovery Communications

Director of Photography 
 2005: Lang Lang in China (HD) - Nightfrog for ARD / Deutsche Grammophon

Cinematographer 
 2003: Camels - NDR Naturfilm for Parthenon Entertainment / NGCI
 2002: Eaten Alive - BBC-NHU
 2001: Bloody Suckers - NHNZ for PBS
 1999: Wild Sex - NHNZ for Discovery Communications
 1999: A Wild Life - NHNZ for Discovery Communications
 1997: Skoovsgaard - Four-part series; Loke Film for TV2

Additional Photography/ Camera Assistant 
 2000: Inca Animals - Heinz von Matthey for ZDF, ORF & Discovery Communications Inc.
 1998: Lions of Etosha - Rudolph Lammers for ZDF
 1998: Animal Hospital - Engstfeld Film for ZDF
 1998: Fabulous Animals - Gruppe 5 for WDR & CANAL+
 1997: Dr. Knock - Dominic Graf for BR

Awards

The Wild Andes 

 40th NEWS & DOCUMENTARY EMMY AWARD Nomination, USA, 2019 * Outstanding Music & Sound * Outstanding Cinematography
 New York Festivals 2019 TV & FILM Awards * SILVER MEDAL NATURE AND WILDLIFE * SILVER MEDAL FEATURE DOC  * GOLD MEDAL CINEMATOGRAPHY
 World Media Festival, Hamburg 2019 * INTERMEDIA AWARD GOLD, Nature & Wildlife
 Mountainfilm, USA, 2019 * SEVEN SUMMITS AWARD
 Indian World Film Festival * BEST DOCUMENTARY
 Deauville Green Awards, France 2019 * Environmental Award
 17th Matsalu Nature Film Festival, Estonia, 2019 * SPECIAL JURY MENTION, CATEGORY NATURE

Iron Jungle - Nature' Return to the Ruhr 

 Kolkata International Wildlife & Environment Film Festival, India, 2017 * BEST DIRECTOR
Woodpecker International Film Festival, India, 2017 * 1st prize (CATEGORY ENVIRONMENT)
Ekotopfilm, Slovakia, 2017 * 1st prize (CATEGORY NATURE AND NATURAL SCIENCE)
TUR Festival, Czech Republic, 2017 * INSPIRATION AWARD
Omni Awards Spring-Competition, USA, 2017 * GOLDEN OMNI AWARD FOR DIRECTING * GOLDEN OMNI AWARD FOR NATURE CATEGORY * GOLDEN OMNI AWARD FOR CINEMATOGRAPHY * GOLDEN OMNI AWARD FOR MUSICAL SCORE
Deauville Green Awards, France, 2017 * FINALIST
Shanghai TV Festival, China, 2017 * FINALIST

Brazil – A Natural History – Part 1: Fragile Forest 

 New York Festivals, USA, 2015: Gold World Medal (Nature & Wildlife)
 Festival de l'Oiseau et de la Nature, France, 2015: Distinction for Best Picture and Immersion in Nature
 US International Film & Video Festival, USA, 2015: Certificate for Creative Excellence
 Festival International du Film Animalier d'Albert, France, 2015: Finalist
 Festival International du Film Ornithologique de Ménigoute, France, 2015: Finalist
 Namur Nature Festival, Belgium, 2015: Finalist

Brazil – A Natural History – Part 2: Wild Heart 
 NaturVision, Germany, 2015: Deutscher Wildlife Filmpreis
 New York Festivals, USA, 2015: Gold World Medal (Nature & Wildlife)

Europe's Last Wild Horses 
 International Wildlife Film Festival (IWFF) Missoula/Montana, USA, 2013: Finalist
 Ekofilm, Czech Republic, 2012: 1st Prize Green Planet
 Omni Awards Fall-Competition, USA, 2012: Omni Awards Fall-Competition, USA, 2012: Two Golden Oomni Award for Cinematography and Nature Category, Three Silver Omni for Writing, Editing, and Documentary Category
 Wildlife Vaasa, Finnnland, 2012: Finalist
 Ekotopfilm, Slovakia, 2012: Finalist
 MTelenatura, Spain, 2012: Finalist
 Matsalu Nature Film Festival, Estonia, 2012: Finalist
 Trofeo Stambecco d'Oro, Italy, 2012: Finalist
 China International Animal & Nature Film Festival, China, 2012: Finalist
 Sondrio, Italy, 2012: Finalist
 Green Screen film festival, Germany, 2012: Audience Award

Jaguar – Hunter in the Pantanal 
 International Animal & Nature Film Festival, China, 2013: Best Photography Award
 FIFA / Albert, France, 2013: Audience Award
 International Wildlife Film Festival (IWFF) Missoula/Montana, USA, 2013: Finalist
 Ekofilm, Czech Republic, 2012: Prize of the Deputy Governor of the Moravian-Silesian Region
 Omni Awards Fall-Competition, USA, 2012: Two Golden Oomni Award for Cinematography and Nature Category, Three Silver Omni for Writing, Editing, Documentary Category
 Wildlife Vaasa, Finland, 2012: Finalist
 Ekotopfilm, Slovakia, 2012: Finalist
 Telenatura, Spain, 2012: Finalist
 Trofeo Stambecco d'Oro, Italy, 2012: Finalist
 Green Vision Festival, Russia, 2012: Grand Prix
 Namur, Belgium, 2012: Finalist
 Internationales Berg- & Abenteuer Filmfestival Graz, Austria, 2012: Finalist
 Festival International du Film Ornitologique Ménigoute, France, 2012, 2012: Finalist
 Darsser Naturfilmfestival, Germany, 2012: Finalist

Amazon Alive – Part 1: Jungle of the Mind 
 Durban Wild Talk Africa, South Africa, 2013: Script Award
 FIFA / Albert, France, 2012: Scientific Award and Special Award for Best Screenplay
 Sichuan TV Festival, China, 2011: Finalist for Best Photography
 Namur, Belgium, 2011: Grand Prix
 Omni Awards – Spring Competition, USA, 2011: Golden OMNI Award for Cinematography, Writing, and Nature Category
 Banff World Media Festival, Canada, 2011: Finalist
 World Media Festival Hamburg, Germany, 2011: Intermedia-Globe Gold
 International Wildlife Film Festival (IWFF), Missoula/Montana, USA, 2011: Finalist and Honorable Mention for Cultural Presentation
 International Forest Film Festival, USA, 2011: Special Jury Award and Finalist in Category 360 Degrees on all things Forest

Amazon Alive – Part 2: Hidden Secrets 
 Sondrio, Italy, 2011: Finalist
 Festival International du Film Ecologique de Bourges, France, 2011: Finalist (High School Award)
 NaturVision, Germany, 2011: Finalist for Best Photography and NaturVision Main Award
 CMS Vatavaran Environment & Wildlife Film Festival, India, 2011: Series Award
 International Film Festival TUR OSTRAVA, Czech Republic, 2011: Prize of the First Deputy Governor of the Region
 Omni Awards – Spring Competition, USA, 2011: Golden Omni Award for Nature Category

Amazon Alive – Part 3: Forest of the Future 
 The World of Knowledge Filmfestival, Russia, 2012: Jury Diploma for Courage and Mastership of the Cameramen
 L'oiseu / Abbeville, France, 2012: Finalist
 TV Festival BAR, Montenegro, 2011: Best Author's Award
 American Conservation Film Festival (ACFF), USA, 2011: Finalist
 Darsser Naturfilmfestival, Germany, 2011: Best Film Category Tiere & Lebensräume (Animals & Ecosystems)
 Matsalu Nature Film Festival, Estonia, 2011: Special Prize of the State Forrest Management Center
 Greenscreen, Germany, 2011: Finalist for Best Ecological Film
 NaturVision, Germany, 2011: Finalist for Environment and Sustainability
 International Wildlife Film Festival (IWFF) Missoula/Montana, USA, 2011: Finalist
 International Forest Film Festival, USA, 2011: Finalist for Issues & Solutions, and This is My Forrest

Wild Russia – Kamchatka 
 Banff Mountain Film Festival, Canada, 2012: Finalist
 Neuquen Mountain Film Festival, Argentina, 2011: Mejor Película Medio Ambiente (Best Environmental Film)
 China International Animal & Nature Film Festival, 2011: YA-AN Award
 FIFAD, Switzerland, 2011: Jean Bovon Award (Best Photography)
 International Wildlife Film Festival (IWFF), Missoula/Montana, USA, 2011: Best Theatrical Release (Cinema version: Russia – Realm of Tigers, Bears and Volcanos)
 Wildlife Vaasa, Finland, 2010: City of Vaasa Special Award
 Torello Mountain Film Festival, Spain, 2010: Prize F.E.E.C. & Silver Edelweiss (Best Photography)
 News and Documentary Emmy Awards, USA, 2010: Finalist
 World Mountain Documentary Festival of Qinghai, China, 2010: Jade Kunlun Award (Best Photography)
 New York Festivals, USA, 2010: Gold World Medal (Series)
 Festival International du Film Animalier, France, 2010: Prix Du Public
 Waga Brothers International Festival of Natures Film, Poland, 2010: Main Award
 Orobie Film Festival, Italy, 2010: Prize Montagna Italia (Best Film)
 OMNI Awards, USA, 2009: 2 Golden Omni Awards
 Sichuan TV Festival, China, 2009: Gold Panda Award (Best Documentary)
 Festival International du Film Ornitologique, France, 2009: Le Lirou D'or (Best Documentary)
 Sondrio, Italy, 2009: Stelvio National Park Award and Students Award
 Matsalu, Estonia, 2009: Best Film
 Greenscreen, Germany, 2009: Best Series
 Naturvision, Germany, 2009: Best German Series

Megafalls of Iguaçu 
 New York Festivals Television Broadcasting, USA, 2008: Silver World Medal Nature & Wildlife
 Waga Brothers International Festival of Natures Film, Poland, 2008: Special Award for Best Photography
 Amazonas Film Festival, Brazil, 2007: Finalist
 Matsalu Nature Film Festival, Estonia, 2007: Best Photography
 Durban Wild Talk, South Africa, 2007: Finalist
 Ekotopfilm, Slovak Republic, 2007: Prize of the Major Hygiener of the Slowak Republic
 Festival International du Film Animalier, France, 2007: Finalist "Prix Special de la Meilleure Image" and "Prix Special de la Meilleure Son"
 GreenScreen Hamburg, Germany, 2007: Finalist
 Japan Wildlife Film Festival, Japan, 2007: Finalist
 Matsalu Nature Film Festival, Estonia, 2007: Best Photography
 Nature Film Festival Darss, Germany, 2007: Goldener Kranich
 NaturVision, Germany, 2007: Finalist
 Sondrio, Italy, 2007: Stelvio National Park Award
 The Shanghai TV Festival, China, 2007: Finalist
 Torello Mountain Film Festival, Spain, 2007: Mountain Wilderness Prize
 WildSouth, New Zealand, 2007: Finalist

Wild Rio 
 World Media Festival – Hamburg, Germany, 2005: Intermedia Globe in Silver
 Shanghai Television Festival, China, 2005: Finalist Magnolia Award
 Ekotopfilm – Bratislava, Slovakia, 2004: Special Prize of the Minister of Foreign Affairs Telenatura, Spain, 2004: Finalist Best Photography
 Wildlife Vaasa, Finland, 2004: Finalist

Viva Vicuña 
 Festival de l'oiseau et de la nature – Abbeville, France, 2004: Special Jury Prize, Public Prize
 IWFF Missoula, USA, 2004: Best Conservation & Environment, Merit Award for Photography
 Festival International du Film ANIMAL Animalier – Albert, France, 2004: Prix Relation Homme, Finalist Grand Prix, Finalist Prix de la Meilleure Image, Finalist Prix Special du Jury
 New York Festivals WINNER, USA, 2004: Finalist
 Festival International du Film Ornithologique de Ménigoute, France, 2003: Prix Paysages, 3è Prix de la Protection de la Nature
 Ökomedia, Germany, 2003: Goldener Luchs Best Nature Film
 Jackson Hole, USA, 2003: Finalist Newcomer
 Telenatura, Spain, 2003: Conservation Award, Special Jury Award Photography
 Ekofilm, Czech Republic, 2003: Finalist
 Ekotopfilm, Slowakia, 2003: Prize of Chamber of Commerce
 Olomouc, Slowakia, 2003: Finalist
 FIFAD, Switzerland, 2003: Prix de L'Enviremont
 Envirofilm, Slowakia, 2003: Finalist
 Sileiua, Kieaie,Kiee

References

External links 
 
 Light & Shadow Productions
 Viva Vikunja – Die Kamele der Anden
 Wildes Rio: DVD at Amazon
https://www.facebook.com/christian.baumeister.146 
https://www.facebook.com/Light-and-Shadow-29822877366/
http://www.wn.de/Muensterland/Kreis-Coesfeld/Havixbeck/2015/12/2202404-Festliches-Wintermahl-Der-Natur-auf-der-Spur
https://www.ndr.de/fernsehen/sendungen/expeditionen_ins_tierreich/baumeisterportraet101.html
https://www.greenscreen-festival.de/festival/regisseure/detail/baumeister/
https://www.instagram.com/lightandshadowtv/

German documentary film directors
Film people from North Rhine-Westphalia
Living people
1971 births
People from Münster